Dundee Crossrail is a proposed railway development in north-east Scotland, first proposed within the 2003 Scottish Strategic Rail Study. It is supported by TACTRAN Tayside's voluntary regional transport partnership.

The proposed service was for a half-hourly service from Arbroath to Perth and for a similar frequency for trains from Dundee to St. Andrews.

References

Proposed railway lines in Scotland